The 2001–02 season saw Wrexham compete in Second Division where they finished in 23rd position with 43 points and were relegated to the Third Division.

Final league table

Key: P = Matches played; W = Matches won; D = Matches drawn; L = Matches lost; F = Goals for; A = Goals against; GD = Goal difference; Pts = Points

Results
Wrexham's score comes first

Legend

Football League Second Division

FA Cup

Football League Cup

Football League Trophy

Squad statistics

References

External links
 Wrexham 2001–02 at Soccerbase.com (select relevant season from dropdown list)

Wrexham A.F.C. seasons
Wrexham